New York State Route 306 (NY 306) is a north–south state highway in western Rockland County, New York, in the United States. NY 306 runs from NY 59 in the hamlet of Monsey to U.S. Route 202 (US 202) in Ladentown, on the western boundary of the village of Pomona.

Route description

NY 306 begins at NY 59 in the Ramapo hamlet of Monsey and proceeds north as Main Street through part of the business district of Monsey. After passing Maple Avenue in the Jewish village of Kaser, NY 306 becomes Monsey–Ladentown Road for the rest of its run. NY 306 quickly leaves the small village and reenters the town of Ramapo.

Ramapo High School is located just east of NY 306 on CR 74. NY 306 then passes a large cemetery called Church of the West Hempstead Cemetery. NY 306 continues north past CR 80, and enters the village of Wesley Hills. There it passes a small shopping center, and proceeds into residential areas. Finally, NY 306 enters Pomona at CR 86. The route ends shortly afterward at US 202.

History

When NY 306 was assigned as part of the 1930 renumbering of state highways in New York, it extended from the New Jersey state line in the south to Willow Grove Road (then part of NY 210) in the north via East Saddle River Road, Monsey–Ladentown Road, and Call Hollow Road. NY 306 was truncated to its current northern terminus at US 202 in Ramapo (now part of the village of Pomona)  and to its modern southern end at NY 59 in Monsey . The former extensions of NY 306 are now largely maintained by Rockland County as CR 73 (East Saddle River Road) and CR 75 (Call Hollow Road north of the Ramapo town line). The current southern terminus of NY 306 in Monsey was the proposed southwestern terminus of the Spring Valley Bypass, a bypass of NY 45 and NY 59 that was never built.

Major intersections

See also

References

External links

306
Transportation in Rockland County, New York